Dicko is the pseudonym of Ian Dickson (TV personality). 

It is also the surname of:
Hamadoun Dicko (1924–1964), Malian politician
Cheikh Sidahmed Dicko (born 1973), Mauritanian geopolitician 
Hassan Idriss Dicko (born 1985), Qatari born-Senegalese footballer
Lala Dicko (born 1991),  Malian footballer
Mahmoud Dicko (born 1954), Malian Salafi imam 
Mohamed Sidda Dicko, Malian politician
Moustapha Dicko, Malian politician
Nouha Dicko (born 1992), Malian footballer
Romane Dicko (born 1999), French judoka

Surnames of Senegalese origin
Surnames of Malian origin